Vincenzo Sellaro, (April 24, 1868 – November 28, 1932), was the founder of the Order of the Sons of Italy in America (OSIA), the largest Italian American Organization in the United States. Sellaro founded the "Figli d'Italia in America" to help Italian Americans work with one another to better their social, civic, and personal standing in society.

Sellaro died at the age of 64 on November 28, 1932 and is buried in Woodlawn Cemetery in the Bronx, New York, where his grave is maintained with a small Italian flag that is placed next to his headstone.

References

American physicians
American people of Italian descent
People from New York City
1868 births
1932 deaths